The Marilyn Horne Song Competition is an annual competition for participants of the voice and piano programs at the Music Academy of The West.

Name 
The Competition was launched in 1997 as the Marilyn Horne Foundation Vocal Competition and held by the Marilyn Horne Foundation. In 2010 the foundation’s programs became part of the Weill Music Institute at Carnegie Hall. The Competition is since being held by the Music Academy of the West under its current name.

Overview 
The competition is held in front of a jury and a public audience. Singers perform three songs, one of which has to be in English. The pianists accompany at least one of the singers. Winning singers and pianists can, but don't have to have performed together. The winners receive a monetary prize and the opportunity to perform in a prestigious venue, among other things. 

The competition commemorates Gwendolyn Koldofsky, who established the first Department of Accompanying at the University of Southern California in 1947. Marilyn Horne recalls Kodofsky as “Teacher, mentor, accompanist, and my dear friend.” Together they had toured for 10 years.

List of winners

References

Song contests
Opera competitions
Music competitions in the United States